Stiff sedge is a common name for several plants and may refer to:

Carex bigelowii
Carex biltmoreana, endemic to the southeastern United States
Carex meadii - Mead's stiff sedge